Austin is a city in Jennings Township, Scott County, in the U.S. state of Indiana. The population was 4,272 at the 2000 census, at which time it was a town; Austin became a city on January 1, 2008. The population was 4,295 at the 2010 census.

History
Austin was platted in 1853, and named after Austin, Texas. A post office has been in operation at Austin since 1854.

HIV Crisis

The federal Centers for Disease Control and Prevention confirms that Austin “contains the largest drug-fueled H.I.V. outbreak to hit rural America in recent history.” Its 5 percent infection rate “is comparable to some African nations.” According to New York Times columnist Thomas Friedman, who visited with Austin's only doctor, Will Cooke, Austin "doesn’t just sit at the intersection between Indianapolis and Louisville but at the intersection of hopelessness and economic ruin.”

In 2015, press reports indicated the city was the center of an outbreak of HIV caused by the use of Opana as an injectable recreational drug. The outbreak required emergency action by state officials. When the outbreak was first detected there were 30 HIV cases in a town that had, up until this point, only had 3 cases over several decades.  After 29 days, by the time Governor Mike Pence determined a course of action, the number of HIV cases had skyrocketed to 79.  In response to the crisis Scott County established "one-stop shop," where people could also get drug treatment referrals, free HIV testing, syringe exchanges, and other services.

Geography
Austin is located at  (38.742361°,-85.804583°).

Climate
The climate in this area is characterized by hot, humid summers and generally mild to cool winters.  According to the Köppen Climate Classification system, Austin has a humid subtropical climate, abbreviated "Cfa" on climate maps.

Demographics

2010 census
As of the 2010 census, there were 4,295 people, 1,674 households, and 1,178 families residing in the city. The racial makeup of the city was 97.1% White, 0.3% African American, 0.3% Native American, 0.2% Asian, 0.7% from other races, and 1.2% from two or more races. Hispanic or Latino of any race were 2.1% of the population.

There were 1,674 households, of which 37.2% had children under the age of 18 living with them, 43.2% were married couples living together, 18.8% had a female householder with no husband present, 8.4% had a male householder with no wife present, and 29.6% were non-families. 25.4% of all households were made up of individuals, and 9.2% had someone living alone who was 65 years of age or older. The average household size was 2.56 and the average family size was 3.00.

The median age in the city was 36.7 years. 25.9% of residents were under the age of 18; 9.7% were between the ages of 18 and 24; 27% were from 25 to 44; 25.3% were from 45 to 64; and 12.3% were 65 years of age or older. The gender makeup of the city was 48.6% male and 51.4% female.

2000 census
As of the 2000 census, there were 4,724 people, 1,793 households, and 1,308 families residing in the town. The racial makeup of the town was 98.20% White, 0.06% African American, 0.15% Native American, 0.19% Asian, 0.78% from other races, and 0.61% from two or more races. Hispanic or Latino of any race were 1.52% of the population.

There were 1,793 households, out of which 36.8% had children under the age of 18 living with them, 51.0% were married couples living together, 16.8% had a female householder with no husband present, and 27.0% were non-families. 22.6% of all households were made up of individuals, and 8.3% had someone living alone who was 65 years of age or older. The average household size was 2.63 and the average family size was 3.06.

In the town the population was spread out, with 29.1% under the age of 18, 10.5% from 18 to 24, 30.0% from 25 to 44, 20.6% from 45 to 64, and 9.8% who were 65 years of age or older. The median age was 32 years. For every 100 females, there were 97.4 males. For every 100 females age 18 and over, there were 95.4 males.

The median income for a household in the town was $28,495, and the median income for a family was $33,267. Males had a median income of $28,468 versus $21,580 for females. The per capita income for the town was $12,431. About 16.6% of families and 19.1% of the population were below the poverty line, including 29.0% of those under age 18 and 15.6% of those age 65 or over.

Notable residents
Albert E. Wiggam - Psychologist and eugenicist

References

External links
 

Cities in Scott County, Indiana
Cities in Indiana